Binfield Park Dam is a dam on the Tyhume River, near Alice, Eastern Cape, South Africa. It was established in  1986, and commissioned in 1987.

The villagers underused the Binfield Park Dam and vicinity areas located nearby – no fishing, aquaculture, irrigation or recreation. It is concluded that with the help from Government and institutions, the appropriate use of indigenous knowledge and the dam can benefit the communities and the environment regarding ecotourism or ecofeminitourism.

See also
List of reservoirs and dams in South Africa
List of rivers of South Africa

Sources 
 List of South African Dams from the Department of Water Affairs and Forestry (South Africa)

References 

Dams in South Africa
Dams completed in 1986
1986 establishments in South Africa